Union Plaza is the name of several buildings including:

Union Plaza (Aberdeen)
Union Plaza (Beijing)
Union Plaza (Hong Kong)
Union Plaza (Oklahoma City)
Union Plaza Hotel or the Union Plaza Casino in Las Vegas renamed to the Plaza Hotel & Casino